Wermelin is a Swedish surname. Notable people with the surname include: 

Atterdag Wermelin (1861–1904),  Swedish revolutionary socialist, writer and poet
Lea Wermelin (born 1985), Danish politician

Swedish-language surnames
Surnames of Danish origin